Jacek Żuławski (29 March 1907 – 27 November 1976) was a Polish sculptor. His work was part of the sculpture event in the art competition at the 1948 Summer Olympics.

References

External links
 

1907 births
1976 deaths
20th-century Polish sculptors
Polish male sculptors
20th-century Polish male artists
Olympic competitors in art competitions
Artists from Kraków
Academy of Fine Arts in Gdańsk alumni